April Lawton (July 30, 1948 – November 23, 2006) was a guitarist and composer who rose to some prominence in the early to mid-1970s as a member of the band Ramatam, which also included at one time former Iron Butterfly guitarist Mike Pinera and the former Jimi Hendrix drummer Mitch Mitchell, as well as Russ Smith (bass, vocals), and Tommy Sullivan (keyboards, reeds, vocals). Her playing style was a mix of Jeff Beck, Hendrix, and Allan Holdsworth. Lawton gave no interviews, refused to discuss her past, and she was rumoured to be transgender—rumours confirmed by her friend, Fanny guitarist June Millington, in a 2010 interview for GuitarGearHeads. Singer Dee Snider claims Lawton was still male while in the band Johnny Maestro and the Brooklyn Bridge.

Mike Pinera, former bandmate, made a statement in Guitar Player magazine regarding Lawton's gender: "I can attest to her being a woman," declares Pinera. "When I asked her about the rumors, she took my hand and gave me a 'first base' account. I know they have technology for that now, but, back then, no way!" Gender reassignment surgery has been practised since the 1930s, and available in the United States from 1965. Social Security Administration Applications and Claims documents provided by Ancestry.com confirm that April Lawton was born Gregory R. Ferrara, male, on 30 July 1948 in Brooklyn, New York, and used this name for Social Security purposes through 1977. Subsequent Social Security records indicate a  name change to April Trewhala, from 15 Feb 1978 through mid-2002. From 31 July 2002 through her death on 06 Dec 2006, Social Security records indicate she used the name April Lawton.

Lawton stayed with Ramatam for two studio albums, their self-titled debut (1972, Atlantic) and In April Came the Dawning of the Red Suns. The group was not commercially successful, and Lawton left after the second album, forming a short-lived solo project called the April Lawton Band, which dissolved in the late 1970s. Lawton then left the music scene to concentrate on painting and graphic design. Her personal life remained very private until her death from heart failure at her home on November 23, 2006, aged 58.

During the 1990s she recorded demos for a future album, and the material remains unreleased. Some brief excerpts are available at the April Lawton tribute website.

References

External links
 http://www.aprillawton.com
 https://web.archive.org/web/20070302203732/http://www.reesho.com/htm/april.htm

1948 births
2006 deaths
American rock guitarists
People from Farmingdale, New York
20th-century American guitarists
20th-century American women guitarists
Transgender artists
20th-century LGBT people
21st-century LGBT people